The 56th Academy Awards ceremony, presented by the Academy of Motion Picture Arts and Sciences (AMPAS), honored the best films of 1983 and took place on April 9, 1984, at the Dorothy Chandler Pavilion in Los Angeles, beginning at 6:00 p.m. PST / 9:00 p.m. EST. During the ceremony, AMPAS presented Academy Awards (commonly referred to as Oscars) in 22 categories. The ceremony, televised in the United States by ABC, was produced by Jack Haley Jr. and was directed by Marty Pasetta.  Comedian and talk show emcee Johnny Carson hosted the show for the fifth time. He first presided over the 51st ceremony held in 1979, and had last hosted the 54th ceremony held in 1982. Nine days earlier, in a ceremony held at The Beverly Hilton in Beverly Hills, California, on March 31, the Academy Scientific and Technical Awards were presented by hosts Joan Collins and Arnold Schwarzenegger.

Terms of Endearment won five awards, including Best Picture. Other winners included Fanny and Alexander and The Right Stuff with four awards, Tender Mercies with two awards, and Boys and Girls, Flamenco at 5:15, Flashdance, He Makes Me Feel Like Dancin', Sundae in New York, The Year of Living Dangerously, and Yentl with one. The telecast garnered 42.1 million viewers in the United States.

Winners and nominees
The nominees for the 56th Academy Awards were announced on February 16, 1984, by Academy president Gene Allen and actor Mickey Rooney. Terms of Endearment earned the most nominations with eleven; The Right Stuff came in second with eight. The winners were announced at the awards ceremony on April 9. James L. Brooks was the third writer-director-producer to win three Oscars for the same film. With four wins, Fanny and Alexander became the most awarded foreign language film in Academy Awards history at the time. Linda Hunt is the only person to win an Oscar for playing a character of the opposite sex. Best Original Song co-winner Irene Cara became the first black woman to win an Oscar in a non-acting category.

Awards

Winners are listed first, highlighted in boldface and indicated with a double dagger.

Honorary Academy Award 
 Hal Roach  "In recognition of his unparalleled record of distinguished contributions to the motion picture art form."

Jean Hersholt Humanitarian Award 
The award recognizes individuals whose humanitarian efforts have brought credit to the motion picture industry.
 M. J. Frankovich

Special Achievement Academy Award

Richard Edlund, Dennis Muren, Ken Ralston and Phil Tippett  for the visual effects of Return of the Jedi.

Films with multiple nominations and awards

Presenters and performers

The following individuals, listed in order of appearance, presented awards or performed musical numbers.

Ceremony information

In September 1983, the Academy hired film producer Jack Haley Jr. to produce the telecast for the third time. "We are excited to have Jack Haley Jr. back on the Academy Awards program this year," said AMPAS President Gene Allen in a press release announcing the selection. "We know that his outstanding talents will ensure an innovative and entertaining approach to the presentation of the Oscar." That same month, it was announced that comedian and The Tonight Show Starring host Johnny Carson would preside over emceeing duties for the 1984 ceremony. Allen explained the decision to hire Carson saying, "In past years, Johnny has been a vital element in the ever-increasing success and popularity of the Oscar presentations. We are extremely pleased that we will be able to draw once again on his wit and charisma to host this special entertainment event."

Several other people were involved with the production of the ceremony. Musician Quincy Jones served as musical director for the ceremony where he conducted an overture performed by the orchestra at the beginning of the show. Former child actress Shirley Temple made a special appearance at the beginning of the telecast to discuss her memories of the 7th ceremony in 1935 where she received the Academy Juvenile Award. Singers Sammy Davis Jr. and Liza Minnelli performed "There's No Business Like Show Business" at the conclusion of the telecast. Marty Pasetta served as director for the telecast. Notably, this was the first Oscars ceremony where the voting rules were announced at the end of the telecast as opposed to the beginning.

Box office performance of Best Picture nominees
At the time of the nominations announcement on February 16, the combined gross of the five Best Picture nominees at the US box office was $151 million. Terms of Endearment was the highest earner among the Best Picture nominees with $72.9 million in the domestic box office receipts. The film was followed by The Big Chill ($52.5 million), The Right Stuff ($15.7 million), Tender Mercies ($8.44 million), and The Dresser ($562,623).

Critical reviews
Columnist Jerry Coffey from the Fort Worth Star-Telegram wrote, "Nothing that goes on during an Oscarcast is worth the tedium dumbly endured by the ever-gullible audience for moviedom's annual spasm of gross self-indulgence." Austin American-Statesman film critic Patrick Taggart commented, "By now after a week after the fact, it is a matter of record that Monday's Academy Awards show was without the dullest ever." He added, "The Oscar went to the predictable choice in every case, and not only were there no surprises among the awards, there weren't even any of those deliciously embarrassing moments that make live television what it is." Television critic Howard Rosenberg of the Los Angeles Times noted, "Be honest. This was not one of your more electrifying Academy Awards telecasts. The three hours and 40 minutes passed as swiftly as Barry Lyndon." He also said, "And the tradition of squeezing nearly all of the major, most glamorous awards into the last half hour again proved mistake, ill conceived, and just plain dumb."

Other media outlets received the broadcast more positively. Television columnist John J. O'Connor of The New York Times wrote, "The tone of the proceedings was set and maintained by a spiritedly genial Mr. Carson." He also added that Carson was able to "provide with eternally boyish grace his typical comedy mix." The Baltimore Sun film critic Stephen Hunter quipped, "The show, one of the crispest and most swiftly-paced in recent years, enjoyed its greatest asset in the return of Johnny Carson to the role of master of ceremonies. Mr. Carson was in top form." Mike Duffy of the Detroit Free Press wrote, "Johnny Carson, once again the invaluable host, added some much needed spice with well-timed zingers. And I especially enjoyed Jack Nicholson's impersonation of a Blues Brother behind those black be-bopper shades."

Ratings and reception
The American telecast on ABC drew in an average of 42.1 million people over the length of the entire ceremony, which was a 21% decrease from the previous year's ceremony. Moreover, the show drew lower Nielsen ratings compared to the previous ceremony with 30.3% of households watching with a 50% share. Nevertheless, the ceremony presentation received four nominations at the 36th Primetime Emmys in August 1984. The following month, the ceremony won one of those nominations for Outstanding Art Direction for a Variety Program (Roy Christopher).

See also
 List of submissions to the 56th Academy Awards for Best Foreign Language Film

Notes

References

Bibliography

External links 

Official websites
 Academy Awards official website
 The Academy of Motion Picture Arts and Sciences official website

Analysis
 1983 Academy Awards Winners and History at Filmsite
 Academy Awards, USA: 1984 at IMDb

Other resources
 

Academy Awards ceremonies
1983 film awards
1984 in Los Angeles
1984 in American cinema
April 1984 events in the United States
Academy
Television shows directed by Marty Pasetta